Lophospermum purpurascens is a climbing or scrambling herbaceous perennial native to Mexico, occurring in the states of Oaxaca, Veracruz and possibly Puebla. It has tubular flowers, white at the base and dark purple elsewhere. It was first described by Wayne J. Elisens in 1985. The epithet purpurascens means purplish or becoming purple.

References

purpurascens
Plants described in 1985